The Mainau Declaration is either of two socio-political appeals by Nobel laureates who participated in the Lindau Nobel Laureate Meetings, the annual gathering with young scientists at the German town of Lindau. The name denotes that these declarations were presented on Mainau Island in Lake Constance, the traditional venue of the last day of the one-week meeting.

Mainau Declaration 1955 
The first Mainau Declaration was an appeal against the use of nuclear weapons. Initiated and drafted by German nuclear scientists Otto Hahn and Max Born, it was circulated at the 5th Lindau Nobel Laureate Meeting (11–15 July 1955) and presented on Mainau Island on 15 July 1955. The declaration was initially signed by 18 Nobel laureates. Within a year, the number of supporters rose to 52 Nobel laureates.

Full text

Signatories
The initial 18 signatories were:
 Kurt Alder
 Max Born
 Adolf Butenandt
 Arthur H. Compton
 Gerhard Domagk
 Hans von Euler-Chelpin
 Otto Hahn
 Werner Heisenberg
 George Hevesy
 Richard Kuhn
 Fritz Lipmann
 Hermann Joseph Muller
 Paul Hermann Müller
 Leopold Ruzicka
 Frederick Soddy
 Wendell M. Stanley
 Hermann Staudinger
 Hideki Yukawa

Mainau Declaration 2015 on Climate Change 

The Mainau Declaration 2015 on Climate Change was presented on Mainau Island, Germany, on the occasion of the last day of the 65th Lindau Nobel Laureate Meeting on Friday 3 July 2015. It is an urgent warning of the consequences of climate change and was initially signed by 36 Nobel laureates. In the months thereafter, 35 additional laureates joined the group of supporters of the declaration. As of February 2016, a total of 76 Nobel laureates endorse the Mainau Declaration 2015.

The text of the declaration states that although more data needs to be analysed and further research has to be done, the climate report by the IPCC still represents the most reliable scientific assessment on anthropogenic climate change, and that it should therefore be used as a foundation upon which policymakers should discuss actions to oppose the global threat of climate change.

Full text

Signatories and supporters

The following Nobel laureates have thus far signed the Mainau Declaration 2015 or expressed their full support after its presentation. 36 Nobel laureates (left column) signed the declaration on 3 July 2015 on the final day of the 65th Lindau Nobel Laureate Meeting; 40 agreed later on for their names to be listed as signatories.

See also
 Lindau Nobel Laureate Meetings

References

External links 
 Mainau Declaration Official Website
 Video of Nobel laureate Brian Schmidt presenting the Mainau Declaration 2015
Political manifestos
Nuclear weapons policy
Anti–nuclear weapons movement
Otto Hahn
Science conferences
Environmentalism
1955 documents
2015 documents